Kenn Kaufman (born 1954) is an American author, artist, naturalist, and conservationist, known for his work on several popular field guides of birds and butterflies in North America.

Born in South Bend, Indiana, Kaufman began birding at the age of six.  When he was nine, his family moved to Wichita, Kansas, where his fascination with birds intensified. At age sixteen, inspired by birding pioneers such as Roger Tory Peterson, he dropped out of high school and began hitchhiking around North America in pursuit of birds.  Three years later, in 1973, he set the record for the most North American bird species seen in one year (671) while participating in a Big Year, a year-long birding competition. However, this record included regions like Baja California that are no longer ornithologically considered part of North America and has since been surpassed. His cross-country birding journey, covering some eighty thousand miles, was eventually recorded in a memoir, Kingbird Highway.

Subsequently, he focused his work on creating and expanding upon birding field guides. In 1992, he was given the Ludlow Griscom Award by the American Birding Association. Kaufman also received the ABA Roger Tory Peterson Award in 2008 for a "lifetime of achievements in promoting the cause of birding."

Kaufman resides in Oak Harbor, Ohio with his wife Kimberly. Today Kenn writes for Birds and Blooms, Bird Watcher's Digest, and works/volunteers at the Black Swamp Bird Observatory.  Kaufman maintains a weblog where he reports bird sightings in the northwest region of Ohio and makes predictions about the spring bird migration.

Bibliography
A Season on the Wind: Inside the World of Spring Migration (2019)
Kaufman Focus Guides: Field Guide to Nature of New England (with Kimberly Kaufman) 
Kaufman Focus Guides: Birds of North America 
 
Kaufman Focus Guides: Butterflies of North America (with Jim P. Brock) 
Kaufman Focus Guides: Mammals of North America (with Rick Bowers and Nora Bowers) 
Kaufman Focus Guides: Insects of North America (with Eric R. Eaton) 
Kingbird Highway 
Lives of North American Birds 
Kaufman Field Guide to Advanced Birding 
Flights Against the Sunset: Stories that Reunited a Mother and Son (2008)

References

External links

Kenn Kaufman's Nature Site
Kenn Kaufman interview at birdwatching.com
Kenn Kaufman interview at Birding magazine

Kaufman, Kenn
Kaufman, Kenn
American ornithological writers
American male non-fiction writers
Kaufman, Kenn
People from South Bend, Indiana
Kaufman, Kenn
Date of birth missing (living people)
People from Wichita, Kansas
People from Oak Harbor, Ohio